Grigory Zheldakov (born February 11, 1992) is a Russian professional ice hockey defenceman who is currently playing with HC Donbass in the Ukrainian Hockey League (UHL).

Zheldakov first played with HC Spartak Moscow in the Kontinental Hockey League during the 2010–11 KHL season.

References

External links 

1992 births
Living people
Admiral Vladivostok players
HC Donbass players
Russian ice hockey defencemen
HC Spartak Moscow players
Torpedo Nizhny Novgorod players
Traktor Chelyabinsk players
HC Yugra players